Nuvork (also Romanized as Nūvork; also known as Navang, Navank, Novork, and Nūrak) is a village in Mardehek Rural District, Jebalbarez-e Jonubi District, Anbarabad County, Kerman Province, Iran. At the 2006 census, its population was 159, in 32 families.

References 

Populated places in Anbarabad County